Robertkochia is a genus of bacteria from the family of Flavobacteriaceae. Robertkochia is named after the German microbiologist Robert Koch.

References

Flavobacteria
Bacteria genera
Taxa described in 2014